Houghton International is a British electro mechanical engineering company operating globally in the repair, maintenance and life extension of rotating electrical machines. Its primary market sectors are power generation, renewables, industrial, water, oil and gas, marine and rail.

It operates through three divisions; Electro Mechanical Services that provides in-house and on-site services, High Voltage Coil manufacturing and Rail which provides AC & DC traction motor and motor alternator (MA) set repairs.

History 
Houghton International was founded in 1984 by Christine and Ron Mitten in Houghton-le-Spring, County Durham. In 1989 motor repair and coil manufacturing divisions were launched and in 2002 the company commenced rewinding AC traction motors.

In 2005 Ron Mitten was elected President of the Association of Electrical and Mechanical Trades (AEMT) an international association representing leading companies in the service and repair industry and a light traction motor overhaul facility was opened.

In 2006 Michael Mitten was appointed Chief Executive Officer.

In 2009 the company marked its silver anniversary (25 years) by opening its second facility.

In 2011 the company commenced an investment plan to expand its facilities and services.

In 2012 a third facility was opened, and the company was awarded occupational health and safety management system accreditation to OHSAS 18001:2007.

In 2013 the company was awarded environmental management system accreditation to BSI EN ISO 14001:2004 and was granted a UK patent GB2494369 for HiTRANS™ its transient dynamic MA Set load test process.

In 2014 the company was a finalist in the 'Training and Development' category at the UK national Rail Business Awards 2013.

Research and development 

The company has developed;

HiFLEX™ A fully tested, totally flexible, insulation system
HiTRAX™ An insulation system for life extending traction motors
HiTRANS™ A patented transient dynamic motor alternator set test process

References

External links 
 Houghton International
 Electrical Apparatus Service Association (EASA)
 Association of Electrical and Mechanical Trades (AEMT)
 NOF Energy
 Energi Coast

Companies established in 1984
Companies based in Newcastle upon Tyne
Electrical engineering companies of the United Kingdom
Electric motors
British brands